Noordwijk is a small village in the Dutch province of Groningen. It is located in the municipality of Marum, about 3 km north of the town of Marum. In 2019, it became part of Westerkwartier.

References

External links 
 

Westerkwartier
Westerkwartier (municipality)
Populated places in Groningen (province)